Grefsen stadion is a football stadium in the Grefsen area of Oslo.  Currently home of Kjelsås Fotball playing in the Norwegian Second Division. The ground has standing areas on three sides, and one seating area with 420 seats.

The stadium's record attendance is 3,295 for a Norwegian Premier League qualification match in 1998 against Kongsvinger IL, although there exist reports of a Vålerenga - Skeid encounter in 1944 where around 5000 spectators were in attendance.

Photos

Transport

The stadium is served by a nearby tram station on the Kjelsås Line; the station is called Grefsen stadion. It is served by lines 11 and 12.

References

Sports venues in Oslo
Football venues in Norway